Bad Ass Bitch, Badass Bitch, and Bad-ass Bitch may refer to:

Music

Albums
Bad Ass Bitch, an EP release by the SKG vocal trance project
Bad-Ass Bitch N' Roll, an EP release by the Löske Swedish punk project

Tracks
"Bad Ass Bitch", a 1989 2 Live Crew track from As Nasty As They Wanna Be
"Bad Ass Bitch", a 1990 Choice track from The Big Payback
"Bad Ass Bitch", a 1999 Lunachicks track from Luxury Problem
"Bad Ass Bitch", a 2002 Coo Coo Cal track from Still Walkin'

See also
Badass (disambiguation)
Bad bitch
Bitch (insult)
Bitchin'